This article gives an overview of the swamp and tall-herb fen communities in the British National Vegetation Classification system.

Introduction

The swamp and tall-herb fen communities of the NVC were described in Volume 4 of British Plant Communities, first published in 1995, along with the aquatic communities.

In total, 28 swamp and tall-herb fen communities have been identified.

The swamp and tall-herb fen communities consist of three separate subgroups:

 twenty-one swamp communities, characterised by being species-poor, each dominated by an often tall or bulky monocotyledon species, with little or nothing in the way of an understorey: S1, S2, S3, S4, S5, S6, S7, S8, S9, S10, S11, S12, S13, S14, S15, S16, S17, S18, S19, S20 and S29
 two communities termed "water-margin vegetation": S22 and S23
 five tall-herb fen communities, which have a more species-rich understorey than the swamps: S24, S25, S26, S27 and S28

List of swamp and tall-herb fen communities

The following is a list of the communities that make up this category:

 S1 Carex elata sedge-swamp Caricetum elatae Koch 1926
 S2 Cladium mariscus swamp and sedge-beds Cladietum marisci Zobrist 1933 emend. Pfeiffer 1961
 S3 Carex paniculata swamp Caricetum paniculatae Wangerin 1916
 S4 Phragmites australis swamp and reed-beds Phragmitetum australis (Gams 1927) Schmale 1939
 S5 Glyceria maxima swamp Glycerietum maximae (Nowinski 1928) Hueck 1931 emend. Krausch 1965
 S6 Carex riparia swamp Caricetum ripariae Soó 1928
 S7 Carex acutiformis swamp Caricetum acutiformis Sauer 1937
 S8 Scirpus lacustris ssp. lacustris swamp Scirpetum lacustris (Allorge 1922) Chouard 1924
 S9 Carex rostrata swamp Caricetum rostratae Rübel 1912
 S10 Equisetum fluviatile swamp Equisetetum fluviatile Steffen 1931 emend. Wilczek 1935
 S11 Carex vesicaria swamp Caricetum vesicariae Br.-Bl. & Denis 1926
 S12 Typha latifolia swamp Typhetum latifoliae Soó 1927
 S13 Typha angustifolia swamp Typhetum angustifoliae Soó 1927
 S14 Sparganium erectum swamp Sparganietum erecti Roll 1938
 S15 Acorus calamus swamp Acoretum calami Schulz 1941
 S16 Sagittaria sagittifolia swamp
 S17 Carex pseudocyperus swamp
 S18 Carex otrubae swamp Caricetum otrubae Mirza 1978
 S19 Eleocharis palustris swamp Eleocharitetum palustris Schennikow 1919
 S20 Scirpus lacustris ssp. tabernaemontani swamp Scirpetum tabernaemontani Passarge 1964
 S21 Scirpus maritimus swamp Scirpetum maritimi (Br.-Bl. 1931) R.Tx. 1937
 S22 Glyceria fluitans water-margin vegetation Glycerietum fluitantis Wilczek 1935
 S23 Other water-margin vegetation Glycerio-Sparganion Br.-Bl. & Sissingh apud Boer 1942 emend. Segal
 S24 Phragmites australis - Peucedanum palustre tall-herb fen Peucedano-Phragmitetum australis Wheeler 1978 emend.
 S25 Phragmites australis - Eupatorium cannabinum tall-herb fen
 S26 Phragmites australis - Urtica dioica tall-herb fen
 S27 Carex rostrata - Potentilla palustris tall-herb fen Potentillo-Caricetum rostratae Wheeler 1980a
 S28 Phalaris arundinacea tall-herb fen Phalaridetum arundinaceae Libbert 1931